Sumbe Airport  is an airport serving the city of Sumbe in Cuanza Sul Province, Angola.

The Sumbe non-directional beacon (Ident: SU) is located on the field.

See also

 List of airports in Angola
 Transport in Angola

References

External links
 OpenStreetMap - Sumbe
 OurAirports - Sumbe

Airports in Angola